London et Kirshenbaum (lit. London & Kirschenbaum) was an Israeli current affairs news show on Israeli Channel 10 between 2002 and 2019. Up to 2015 it was hosted by two veterans Israeli journalists, Yaron London and Moti Kirschenbaum until Kirschenbaum's death, afterwards London continued to host the show under the same name in honor of Kirschenbaum.

Overview
The show interviewed Israeli politicians, public figures, artists and scientists, and often ended with music performance. The show won an Israeli Academy Award for best current affairs news show in 2005. Despite Kirschenbaum's death on September 25, 2015, London stated that the show would stay on air and its title would remain unchanged.

Its last show aired on January 10, 2019.

Regular guests
Raviv Drucker – Political commentator
Zvi Yehezkeli – Arab world affairs commentator and head of the Arab desk at channel 10
Nadav Eyal – Foreign Affairs commentator and head of the International desk at News 10
Matan Hodorov – Economic commentator

See also
Television in Israel
Culture of Israel

References

External links
London et Kirschenbaum official website, at Nana 10 website. 

Channel 10 (Israeli TV channel) original programming
Israeli television news shows
2002 Israeli television series debuts